"Sunglasses" is a song by English rock band Black Country, New Road. It was released first as a single on 26 July 2019, through Blank Editions. A different and longer version of the song was released on 5 February 2021, for their debut album, For the First Time. The song has been described as post-punk and post-rock.

2019 version
"Sunglasses" was Black Country, New Road's second single, following "Athens, France" from January 2019. The song is nine minutes long and features instruments such as saxophone and violin alongside a rock ensemble. The song has been described as "a wild ride, morphing from post-rock to post-punk to an explosion of free-jazzy noise"  and "poetic hysteria in a turbulent yet addictive brass-flecked track".

"Sunglasses" was released digitally via Speedy Wunderground and physically via Blank Editions. There were three different 7-inch pressings, each with different covers: the first was limited to 500 copies with every copy having a different picture featured on the cover, making each copy unique; the second limited to 250, with the cover art featuring a marching band; and the third with an "undisclosed" number of copies featuring a picture of the band assembling the first pressing. The first pressing sold out within 2 hours. For the second pressing, the 250 copies were split, with 130 being available online, and the rest distributed to "select record stores". Each edition cost the same price of 11 GBP ( USD).

The digital release of the song included an abridged four-and-a-half minute long edit of the song.

2021 version
A different, 10-minute re-recording of the song was made for Black Country, New Road's debut album, For the First Time, which was released through Ninja Tune. This version features a slow distorted guitar intro not included in the 2019 version, along with subtle differences, such as lines being changed. Isaac Wood's spoken word vocals become a more subtle singing, and have a more "conscious control over the song's sonic range" overall, as saxophonist Lewis Evans explains.

Track listing

References

2019 singles
British rock songs
Post-punk songs
Post-rock songs